Zhu Ziqing (November 22, 1898 – August 12, 1948), born Zhu Zihua, was a renowned Chinese poet and essayist. Zhu studied at Peking University, and during the May Fourth Movement became one of several pioneers of modernism in China during the 1920s. Zhu was a prolific writer of both prose and poetry, but is best known for essays like "Retreating Figure",  and "You. Me.". His best known work in verse is the long poem "Destruction" or Huimie.

Early life

In 1916, Zhu graduated from Secondary school and entered Peking University where he fell in love and married Wu Zhongqian. A year later, he changed his name from Zihua to Ziqing, the name change was said to be due to his family's dire economic conditions. Zhu graduated in 1920, and  went to various secondary schools in Hangzhou, Yangzhou, Shanghai and Ningbo to teach. During his time as a teacher, he was also active in the poetry circles, and became a well-known poet.

The essay "" (Green) was written by Zhu Ziqing about the beauty of Meiyu Pond and waterfall in the Middle Yandang Mountains in Xianyan Subdistrict, Ouhai District, Wenzhou of southeastern Zhejiang province in eastern China after his visits to the area in 1923. A selection from "" (Green) is among the sixty potential reading selections test takers may be asked to read for the Putonghua Proficiency Test.

Academia

Later, he was appointed professor of Chinese Literature at Tsinghua University in 1925, and on August 1928, he published his first essay collection known as "Retreating Figure". The book became a wild hit and he soon established his name as a prolific author and poet. However, Zhu's wife soon died which was a terrible blow to Zhu. From 1931 to 1932 he studied English Literature and Linguistics in London. He married his second wife Chen Zhuyin and continued to teach at Tsinghua University.

In 1937, when the Second Sino-Japanese War broke out, Zhu followed his university to move to Changsha, Kunming and Chengdu. During this time, Zhu continued to teach in other universities.

Later years and death

After the Second World War, Zhu encouraged his students in Kunming to oppose Chiang Kai-shek for starting the Chinese Civil War. In 1946, he returned to Beijing and was appointed the Head of the Chinese Language Department in Tsinghua University. When he heard of the assassination of patriotic authors Li Gongpu and Wen Yiduo, Zhu disregarded his own safety to attend the funeral of both men.

Zhu later died on August 12, 1948 after joining the rebellion of refusing aid from the United States. Though it is a common belief that Zhu died of starvation due to Mao Zedong's famous article "Farewell, Leighton Stuart". However, the real cause of Zhu's death was gastric perforation resulting from his severe stomach ulcers.

References

Portrait 
   Zhu Ziqing. A Portrait by Kong Kai Ming at Portrait Gallery of Chinese Writers (Hong Kong Baptist University Library).

External links 

Biography
Capsule biography from Renditions
Bilingual edition of Zhu Ziqing's "Retreating Figure"

 
 
 Bibliography of Secondary Works from the MCLC Resource Center

1898 births
1948 deaths
National University of Peking alumni
Academic staff of Tsinghua University
Academic staff of the National Southwestern Associated University
Writers from Lianyungang
Republic of China poets
Republic of China essayists
Poets from Jiangsu
20th-century Chinese poets
20th-century essayists